Con Sabor A... Mariana is the third album by the Mexican singer Mariana Seoane, released in 2006.

Track listing
 Mermelada	
 El Pueblo	
 Que Rico
 Ahora Vete	
 Con Veneno O Con Miel
 La Mañana
 Caricatura De Amor
 No Te Dejo De Pensar	
 Si Te Vas
 Tan Sólo Puedo Amarte
 Mermelada [Cumbia Norteña]

References

Mariana Seoane albums
2006 albums